HMAS Stuart (F21/DE 48) was one of six s built for the Royal Australian Navy (RAN). The ship was laid down by the Cockatoo Docks and Engineering Company at Cockatoo Island Dockyard in 1959, and commissioned into the RAN in 1963.

During the ship's career, Stuart achieved a number of historical firsts: she was the first RAN ship to fly the Australian White Ensign, and the first major vessel to be homeported at Fleet Base West.

Stuart was paid off in 1991, a year later than originally planned; RAN commitments to the Gulf War saw several warships deployed to the Middle East, and Stuart was retained in service to boost local defence. The destroyer escort was sold for scrapping.

Construction
The first four ships of the River class were based on the Royal Navy's Type 12 frigate, and were intended to close the gap between ships and submarines in regards to anti-submarine warfare, following the rapid improvement of submarines during and after World War II.

Stuart was laid down by Cockatoo Docks and Engineering Company in Sydney on 20 March 1959. She was launched on 8 April 1961 by Bettina Gorton, the wife of future Prime Minister John Gorton, then Minister for the Navy, and was commissioned into the RAN in Sydney on 28 June 1963.

Stuart and the other River-class ships were fitted with the Ikara anti-submarine missile system: the first Australian-designed naval weapons system. Stuart was the first ship to fire an Ikara missile, during trials in August 1963.

Operational history
On 25 December 1966, while operating as part of the Far East Strategic Reserve, Stuart was the first ship to fly the Australian White Ensign. The Australian White Ensign did not officially replace the British White Ensign as the ensign flown by RAN ships until 1 March 1967.

From late 1968 until 1969, Stuart was designated Flagship of the RAN, while the aircraft carrier  underwent a major refit.

During April and May 1970, she carried out escort duties for the Royal Yacht Britannia during the visit to Australia by Queen Elizabeth II and the Duke of Edinburgh.

Following the destruction of Darwin by Cyclone Tracy in December 1974, Stuart was one of thirteen RAN ships deployed as part of the humanitarian aid mission Operation Navy Help Darwin. Stuart sailed from Sydney on 26 December.

In 1979, Stuart entered dock to undergo a half-life modernisation refit valued at A$50 million. This included upgrades to weapons and systems, reinforcement of the hull, and improvements to seakeeping and habitability. The main improvement was the installation of the Australian-developed Mulloka sonar system. Delays and cost increases meant that Stuart did not re-enter service until 1983.

In January 1984, Stuart became the first major RAN warship to be homeported at Fleet Base West in Western Australia. Between May 1984 and September 1986, the ship was deployed to South East Asia three times. Stuart returned to Western Australia in November 1988.

Stuart was originally intended to leave service in early 1990, but the Iraqi invasion of Kuwait saw Australia commit several s to the United States-led Coalition. Stuart was kept in service to perform the local defence duties of the deployed frigates.

Decommissioning and fate
Stuart was paid off on 26 July 1991. She was later sold for scrapping.

Citations

References
 
 
 
 
 

River-class destroyer escorts
Training ships of the Royal Australian Navy
1961 ships